Anolis savagei is a species of lizard in the family Dactyloidae. The species is found in Costa Rica.

References

Anoles
Reptiles described in 2017
Endemic fauna of Costa Rica
Reptiles of Costa Rica